Kayla Miracle (born April 26, 1996) is an American wrestler competing through Campbellsville University, Kentucky. She is currently majoring in Sports Management.

Wrestling 
Miracle is a two time U.S. Open Champion in 2017 and 2018. She won the 2015, 2016, and 2017 University Nationals. She won the 2018 Klippan Lady Open in Sweden. In 2015 she won the 136-pound title in the Women's Collegiate Wrestling Association finals in Saint Louis, Missouri. She is the fourth wrestler to win four Women's Collegiate Wrestling Association national titles.

In 2020, she won the silver medal at the Pan American Wrestling Olympic Qualification Tournament, in the women's 62 kg division.

She currently trains at the Hawkeye Wrestling Club in Iowa City, Iowa.

On February 13, 2018 she was named USA Wrestling Athlete of the Week. She was selected to compete in the 2020 Summer Olympics. She competed in the women's freestyle 62 kg event.

She won the silver medal in the 62kg event at the 2022 World Wrestling Championships held in Belgrade, Serbia.

Miracle is a lesbian and the first out LGBTQ Olympic wrestler.

References

External links
 

American female sport wrestlers
Kayla Miracle
1996 births
Living people
Wrestlers at the 2019 Pan American Games
Place of birth missing (living people)
Pan American Games gold medalists for the United States
Pan American Games medalists in wrestling
Medalists at the 2019 Pan American Games
Pan American Wrestling Championships medalists
Wrestlers at the 2020 Summer Olympics
Lesbian sportswomen
21st-century American women
Olympic wrestlers of the United States
World Wrestling Championships medalists